Ali Rahma Al Marri (born 27 December 1983) is a Qatari footballer who currently plays for Al-Wakrah as a midfielder. He also previously played for the Qatar national team.

Career
He was capped 15 times by the Qatar national team between 2002 and 2004.

Club career statistics
Statistics accurate as of 10 February 2012

2Includes Sheikh Jassem Cup.
3Includes AFC Champions League.

External links
Footballdatabase.eu - Player profile

References

1983 births
Living people
Al-Wakrah SC players
Al-Arabi SC (Qatar) players
Al-Rayyan SC players
Al-Khor SC players
Al-Sailiya SC players
Qatari footballers
Qatar Stars League players
Qatar international footballers
Footballers at the 2002 Asian Games
Association football midfielders
Asian Games competitors for Qatar